Eduardo Pereira Rodrigues (born 7 January 1992), commonly known as Dudu, is a Brazilian professional footballer who plays as an attacking midfielder and winger for Palmeiras.

Career

Early career
Dudu began his career in the youth side for Cruzeiro and earned on 14 June 2009 his first cap in the Campeonato Brasileiro Série A against Palmeiras. On 27 April 2010, Coritiba signed the 18-year-old attacking midfielder on loan from Cruzeiro until December 2010.

Dudu returned to Cruzeiro for the 2011 season. On 25 June in the match against Coritiba  Dudu, playing as a substitute, surprised the coach Joel Santana, who said: "Dudu entered really well in the match. He is such a bold boy, intelligent, he doesn't forget the instructions. He is audacious, even being a little guy. It proves that tallness isn't really important for football. Quality, ability and competence are. He showed he is such a competent player, in spite of his young age."

Dynamo Kyiv
On 27 August 2011, it was announced on his team Cruzeiro's official homepage that Dudu would join Ukrainian side Dynamo Kyiv on a €5 million offer.

Grêmio
On 11 February 2014, Dudu was loaned to Grêmio until the end of the Brazilian season, on 31 December 2014.

Palmeiras
After almost being signed by Corinthians, on 11 January 2015 Dudu joined rival Palmeiras on a four-year contract. While being among the most important players in the squad, Dudu was also criticised by the fans due to his temperamental behavior on the pitch, which included being sent-off during the 2015 Campeonato Paulista finals after hitting the referee. He helped Palmeiras win the 2015 Copa do Brasil, by scoring twice in the final match against Santos. By the start of the 2016 season, the attitude problems were no longer an issue as Dudu took over as club captain following an elbow injury from former captain Fernando Prass. He then led the team to another title, the 2016 Campeonato Brasileiro, the ninth in the club's history. 

In March 2018, he extended his contract until 2022. After the arrival of Roger Machado as the new head coach, Dudu was no longer wearing the armband for the team, while still being a regular starter on the left side of the attack.

International career
On 28 October 2011, while playing for Dynamo, Dudu was called up to the senior team by manager Mano Menezes for friendlies against Gabon and Egypt. He made his national debut against Gabon on 10 November.

Career statistics

Club

International

Honours

Club
Coritiba
 Campeonato Brasileiro Série B: 2010
Cruzeiro
 Campeonato Mineiro:2011
FC Dynamo Kyiv
 Ukrainian Cup: 2013-14
Palmeiras
 Campeonato Brasileiro Série A: 2016, 2018, 2022
 Copa do Brasil: 2015
 Copa Libertadores: 2020, 2021
 Campeonato Paulista: 2020, 2022
 Recopa Sudamericana: 2022
 Supercopa do Brasil: 2023

International
Brazil U20
FIFA U-20 World Cup: 2011
Brazil U17
South American U-17 Championship: 2009

Individual
 Bola de Ouro: 2018
 Bola de Prata: 2016, 2017, 2018, 2019, 2022
 Campeonato Brasileiro Série A Team of the Year: 2016, 2018
 Campeonato Brasileiro Série A top assist provider: 2016, 2018
 Campeonato Paulista Best Player: 2022
 Campeonato Paulista Team of the Year: 2018, 2019, 2022
 Copa Libertadores Dream Team: 2018, 2021
South American Team of the Year: 2018
 FIFA Club World Cup Silver Ball: 2021

References

External links
 
 

1992 births
Living people
Brazilian footballers
Cruzeiro Esporte Clube players
Sportspeople from Goiânia
Coritiba Foot Ball Club players
FC Dynamo Kyiv players
Grêmio Foot-Ball Porto Alegrense players
Sociedade Esportiva Palmeiras players
Al-Duhail SC players
Campeonato Brasileiro Série A players
Campeonato Brasileiro Série B players
Ukrainian Premier League players
Qatar Stars League players
Association football midfielders
Brazilian expatriate footballers
Brazilian expatriate sportspeople in Ukraine
Brazilian expatriate sportspeople in Qatar
Copa Libertadores-winning players
Expatriate footballers in Ukraine
Expatriate footballers in Qatar
Brazil youth international footballers
Brazil under-20 international footballers
Brazil international footballers